The 2011 BWF Super Series Finals was a top level badminton competition which was held from December 14 to December 18, 2011 in Liuzhou, China. The final was held by Chinese Badminton Association and sponsored by Li-Ning. It was the final event of the BWF Super Series competition on the 2011 BWF Super Series schedule. The total purse for the event was $500,000.

Representatives by nation

§: Christinna Pedersen from Denmark, Zhao Yunlei from China and Cheng Wen-Hsing from China Taipei were the players who played in two categories (women's doubles and mixed doubles).

Performance by nation

Men's singles

Group A

Group B

Finals

Women's singles

Group A

Group B

Finals

Men's doubles

Group A

Group B

Finals

Women's doubles

Group A

Group B

Finals

Mixed doubles

Group A

Group B

Finals

References

External links
BWF World Superseries Finals 2011 at tournamentsoftware.com

BWF World Superseries Finals
Masters Finals
2011 BWF World Superseries Finals
BWF Super Series Finals